Russell Webb may refer to:

Russell Webb (musician) (born 1958), Scottish bass guitarist
Russell Webb (water polo) (born 1945), American retired water polo player
Alexander Russell Webb (1846-1916), American writer, publisher, and diplomat, early convert to Islam